Simon Fowler is the lead vocalist and acoustic guitarist in Ocean Colour Scene.

Simon Fowler may also refer to:

Simon Fowler (author), social historian
Simon Fowler (photographer) (born 1954), whose pop photos appeared in Smash Hits magazine